The 1953 All-SEC football team consists of American football players selected to the All-Southeastern Conference (SEC) chosen by various selectors for the 1953 college football season. Alabama won the conference.

All-SEC selections

Ends
John Carson, Georgia (AP-1, UP-1)
Jim Pyburn, Auburn (AP-1, UP-1)
Roger Ratroff, Tennessee (AP-2, UP-2)
Joe Tuminello, LSU (AP-2)
Sam Hensley, Georgia Tech (UP-2)
Mack Franklin, Tennessee (UP-3)
Bud Willis, Alabama (UP-3)

Tackles
Sid Fournet, LSU (AP-1, UP-1)
Frank D'Agostino, Auburn (AP-1, UP-3)
Bob Fisher, Tennessee (AP-2, UP-1)
Bob Sherman, Georgia Tech (AP-2, UP-3)
Ed Culpepper, Alabama (UP-2)
George Mason, Alabama (UP-2)

Guards
Crawford Mims, Ole Miss (AP-1, UP-1)
Ray Correll, Kentucky (AP-1, UP-2)
Joe D'Agostino, Florida (AP-2, UP-1)
George Atkins, Auburn (AP-2, UP-3)
Orville Vernon, Georgia Tech (UP-2)
Al Robetot, Tulane (UP-3)

Centers
Larry Morris, Georgia Tech (AP-1, UP-1)
Ralph Carrigan, Alabama (AP-2, UP-3)
Hal Easterwood, Miss. St. (UP-2)

Quarterbacks
Jackie Parker, Miss. St. (College Football Hall of Fame)  (AP-1, UP-1 [as hb])
Zeke Bratkowski, Georgia (AP-2, UP-1)
Jimmy Wade, Tennessee (AP-2, UP-2)
Tommy Lewis, Alabama (UP-3)

Halfbacks
Corky Tharp, Alabama (AP-1, UP-1)
Leon Hardeman, Georgia Tech (AP-2, UP-2)
Ralph Paolone, Kentucky (AP-2)
Billy Teas, Georgia Tech (UP-2)
Bobby Freeman, Auburn (UP-3)
Jerry Morehand, LSU (UP-3)

Fullbacks
Steve Meilinger, Kentucky (College Football Hall of Fame)  (AP-1, UP-1)
Glenn Turner, Georgia Tech (AP-1, UP-2)
Haral Lofton, Ole Miss (UP-3)

Key

AP = Associated Press

UP = United Press.

Bold = Consensus first-team selection by both AP and UP

See also
1953 College Football All-America Team

References

All-SEC
All-SEC football teams